Hilo soil is the official state soil of the state of Hawaii. The Hawaiian definition of the word “Hilo” is “first night after the new moon.” Also, the word is the Polynesian term for “Navigator,” and the name of a town, Hilo, Hawaii.

Profile
The Hilo soil series consists of very deep, moderately well drained soils that formed in many layers of volcanic ash with lesser amounts of dust from the deserts of central Asia. These dust layers are noticeable because their gray color contrasts with the dark brown and dark reddish brown subsoil formed in volcanic ash. There are several buried layers within the Hilo soil profile. Hilo soils occur on the uplands of the Mauna Kea volcano along the Hāmākua Coast on the island of Hawaii.

See also
Pedology (soil study)
Soil types
List of U.S. state soils

References
Soil Survey of the Islands of Hawaii
Hawaiian state soil

Volcanic soils
Geography of Hawaii County, Hawaii
Geology of Hawaii
Hawaii (island)
Pedology
Soil in the United States
Symbols of Hawaii